The West Palm Beach mayoral election took place in March 2015 to elect a mayor for West Palm Beach, Florida. Incumbent Jeri Muoio won re-election for a second term in office.

References

2015 Florida elections
West Palm Beach
West Palm Beach, Florida